Sam Phillipou (born 18 September 1974) is a former Australian rules footballer who played for Footscray in the Australian Football League (AFL) in 1995. He was recruited from the Woodville-West Torrens Football Club in the South Australian National Football League (SANFL) with the 29th selection in the 1992 AFL Draft.  He staying in South Australia for two years, before signing a two-year contract with Footscray at the end of the 1994 season. However, he was delisted at the end of the 1995 season, and returned to South Australia.

References

External links

Living people
1974 births
Western Bulldogs players
Woodville-West Torrens Football Club players
Port Adelaide Magpies players
Australian rules footballers from South Australia